Bert Lewis (1895–1950) was a baseball pitcher.

Bert or Bertie Lewis may also refer to:
Bert Lewis of Chair Entertainment
Bert Lewis (musician) on Steamboat Willie in 1928
Bert Lewis, character in list of Secret Army episodes in 1977–1979
Bertie Lewis (1920–2010), British airman and peace campaigner
Bertie Lewis (priest) (1931–2006), Welsh clergyman

See also
Albert Lewis (disambiguation)
Robert Lewis (disambiguation)
Herbert Lewis (disambiguation)
Hubert Lewis (disambiguation)